The Space and Missiles Analysis Group is a unit of the National Air and Space Intelligence Center that develops space and counterspace threat assessments and assesses foreign land-based ballistic missile systems with ranges of  and greater.

Units
 Ballistic Missile Analysis Squadron – Wright-Patterson AFB, Ohio
 Special Analysis Squadron – Wright-Patterson AFB, Ohio

Major Command
 Air Staff (United States), Deputy Chief of Staff for Intelligence, Surveillance, Reconnaissance, and Cyber Effects Operations of the United States Air Force, (1 October 2014 – present)
 Air Force Intelligence, Surveillance and Reconnaissance Agency (2007–30 Sept 2014)
 Air Combat Command (2001–2007)
 Air Intelligence Agency (1993–2001)

List of commanders

 Col Kevin Glenn, ~2010
 Col Bradley Hayworth, 19 June 2012
 Col Jay Stewart, ~2016
 Col Katharine Barber, 6 July 2018

References

External links
National Space Policy
 National Space Policy Factsheet
 National Security Space Strategy, Unclassified Summary
 National Security Space Strategy Factsheet
 Space Posture Review
 OASD(A) Space and Intelligence Office (SIO)
 National Security Space Strategy
 AF ISR Agency Homepage
 Air Force Space Command
 National Reconnaissance Office
 USSTRATCOM
 Joint Functional Component Command for Space (JFCC-SPACE) Factsheet

Intelligence groups of the United States Air Force
Military units and formations in Ohio